Baheri  Assembly constituency is  one of the 403 constituencies of the Uttar Pradesh Legislative Assembly,  India. It is a part of the Bareilly district and  one of the five assembly constituencies in the Pilibhit Lok Sabha constituency. First election in this assembly constituency was held in 1957 after the "DPACO (1956)" (delimitation order) was passed in 1956. After the "Delimitation of Parliamentary and Assembly Constituencies Order" was passed in 2008, the constituency was assigned identification number 118.

Wards  / Areas
Extent  of Baheri Assembly constituency is KCs Baheri, Rai Nawada, Banjaria, Richha,  Baheri NPP, Richha NP & Faridpur NP of Baheri Tehsil.

Members of the Legislative Assembly

Election results

2022

2007
15th Vidhan Sabha: 2007 General  Elections

See also
Bareilly Lok Sabha constituency
Pilibhit district
Sixteenth Legislative Assembly of Uttar Pradesh
Uttar Pradesh Legislative Assembly
Vidhan Bhawan

References

External links
 

Assembly constituencies of Uttar Pradesh
Politics of Bareilly district
Constituencies established in 1956